State Route 7 (SR 7) is a state highway in the U.S. state of California, running from the Calexico East Port of Entry on the U.S.-Mexico border east of Calexico north to its terminus at Interstate 8 (I-8), where Orchard Road continues the route north towards Holtville. The route provides convenient access to the country of Mexico from I-8. The southern portion of the route opened in 1996, and the rest of the route connecting to I-8 opened in 2005.

Route description
SR 7 begins at the Calexico East Border Station, which is open from 6 am to 10 pm, seven days a week. Just north of the border, the highway splits into two roads to pass through the customs checkpoints: the fork to the west is for cars, and the fork to the east is for commercial vehicles. The California Department of Transportation (Caltrans) considers the western fork for cars as the SR 7 spur route, while the eastern fork is part of SR 7 proper. At their junction, the western fork passes over the other fork at the northern end and merges into that highway.

From the border to I-8, SR 7 is an expressway known as Orchard Road. Before reaching I-8, SR 7 travels north and has an at-grade intersection with SR 98 and a few other roads. At its northern end, SR 7 turns into County Route S32 (still Orchard Road) as it intersects with I-8. The entire route runs through the Sonoran Desert and is built to expressway standards.

The route was constructed to allow commercial traffic to travel between Mexico and the United States. SR 7 is part of the California Freeway and Expressway System, and is part of the National Highway System, a network of highways that are considered essential to the country's economy, defense, and mobility by the Federal Highway Administration. In 2013, SR 7 had an annual average daily traffic (AADT) of 2,450 at the Calexico inspection station, and 15,900 at Menvielle Road along the spur, the latter of which was the highest AADT for the highway.

History
SR 7 was added to the state highway system in 1990, and to the Freeway and Expressway System in 1998. The segment from the Mexican border to SR 98 was completed by March 1996 to expressway standards; this cost $9.1 million (about $ in  dollars) to complete. However, the border crossing was not opened until December 2, 1996, due to delays in constructing the Mexican portion of the border crossing. Because of the 1994 economic crisis in Mexico, there were insufficient funds to complete the road leading to the border facility on the Mexican side, as well as the Mexican border facility itself. The segment from SR 98 to I-8 began construction in March 2004 at a cost of $64.5 million (about $ in  dollars); and, it was completed in mid-2005.

California State Route 7 was used from 1964 to 1983 for the Long Beach Freeway in the Los Angeles metropolitan area, which is now Interstate 710.

Major intersections
Postmiles were measured based on the road's original alignment and do not necessarily reflect current mileage. The "S" prefix refers to the spur route that splits off at the Calexico East Port of Entry to pass through the western customs checkpoints for cars.

See also

References

External links

California @ AARoads.com – State Route 7
Caltrans: Route 7 highway conditions
California Highways: Route 7

007
State Route 007
Calexico, California
El Centro metropolitan area